A route summit is the highest point on a transportation route crossing higher ground. The term is often used in describing railway routes, less often in road transportation. In canal terminology, the highest pound on a route is called the summit pound.

Examples of usage

Rail 

 Beattock Summit
 Stainmore Summit, formerly the second highest railway in England until its closure in 1962
 Summit Tank - highest point Unanderra - Moss Vale
 Cullerin - highest point Sydney - Albury
 Shap

Transport infrastructure